The Seattle Sounders–Vancouver Whitecaps rivalry is a soccer rivalry between the Vancouver Whitecaps FC and Seattle Sounders FC, both based in the Pacific Northwest region. The rivalry originated in the North American Soccer League of the 1970s, with both cities reviving expansion teams, and has carried into lower-level leagues, including the A-League and USL First Division. The rivalry moved to Major League Soccer, the top division of soccer in the United States and Canada, in 2011. The two clubs are part of the Cascadia Cup, the trophy and competition created in 2004 by supporters of the Portland Timbers, Vancouver Whitecaps, and the Seattle Sounders which is awarded each season to the best top-flight soccer team in the Cascadia region.

Seattle and Vancouver have had rivalries based on various sports teams. Of the five major sports leagues in North America, the two cities each have franchises in the National Hockey League with the Canucks and the Kraken, which joined in 2021. They also had a series between the SuperSonics and Grizzlies of the NBA, before the eventual relocation of both franchises.

History

Overall stats

NASL era
Both Pacific Northwest cities joined the North American Soccer League, the top-flight of the American and Canadian soccer systems, in 1974. The clubs were founded on the same date—December 11, 1973—and predated their fellow Cascadian rival Portland by one year. Future Sounders manager Brian Schmetzer played for the NASL incarnation of the franchise and was part of the Washington–British Columbia junior soccer exchange program that sent Seattle athletes to the Vancouver area to play their teams and stay with Canadian families.

The strong cultural and trade links between the two cities in the new soccer rivalry, including the experience of Alan Hinton, who was a player-coach for the Whitecaps in two different stints before becoming a Seattle resident in 1979 and Sounders broadcaster. Hinton recalled the NASL crowds and significant presence of rival fans at away games: "It's a great rivalry...Years ago they'd come down in their thousands. There was no television in those days, so you'd get as much as three or four thousand Vancouver fans." This tradition has manifested itself in the modern-day fan culture and a similar situation can also be seen in Major League Baseball, as Canadian fans flock to Seattle and dominate the stands at T-Mobile Park during Toronto Blue Jays visits to face the Seattle Mariners. As a result, animosity can prevail at the stadiums where "Everyone hates it here when it happens. Everybody is mad at the Canadians."

Ultimately, the series ended after the 1983 North American Soccer League season as the league lost financial stability and would soon collapse. In the final season of competition between the clubs, the Whitecaps defeated Seattle 2 to 1 before 60,342 fans in Empire Stadium, the largest crowd to watch a match between the two in series history. Ultimately, Vancouver led the NASL series 16–11–2 but Seattle took all four postseason matchups.

USL era
After the NASL's collapse, the cities had a variety of professional soccer teams playing in domestic leagues before reuniting in the A-League in 1994. During this period, the Cascadia Cup was founded by the supporters groups of the teams, in conjunction with those of the Portland Timbers. The A-League ultimately became the USL First Division, which the clubs competed in until the Sounders made the jump to the first-division Major League Soccer in 2009.

MLS era
Two seasons after the Sounders joined MLS, Vancouver joined them as an expansion franchise in 2011. The first match featured an early lead for the Whitecaps but the Sounders scored two goals from Mauro Rosales and Osvaldo Alonso after the 81st minute. Ultimately, Eric Hassli erased the deficit with one of the greatest goals in MLS history to end the inaugural MLS match in a draw. Several years later, Kekuta Manneh became the youngest player in MLS history to score a hat-trick with three goals in a 4–1 victory in Seattle. The rivalry's intensity was felt on the pitch several times in the 2010s, punctuated by Brad Evans headbutting David Edgar in a 2016 match.

In 2015, the clubs squared off in the CONCACAF Champions League group stage, their first meeting in a continental tournament. The Sounders routed the Whitecaps in the second leg to win 3–0 on aggregate and advanced to the quarterfinals. Two years later, the clubs met in the domestic postseason for the first time. The first leg of the conference semifinals was particularly contentious, as teams nearly brawled while security guards ejected leaders of the Emerald City Supporters group for brandishing antifascist signs. After the scoreless draw at BC Place, the Sounders took the second leg 2–0 from second-half goals from Clint Dempsey to send the club to a second straight Western Conference Championship game.

Fredy Montero, one of the Sounders' first stars and all-time leading goal scorer, moved across the border to Vancouver in 2017. During his first season in Vancouver, the former Sounder said, "the supporters took some time to adopt me as one of their own — and I respected that. They knew my history in Seattle, and I knew that I had to earn their love." Montero went on to win the team's Golden Boot award in his first season in Vancouver, highlighted by a brace in his first meeting against his former mates, and then scoring a shorthanded equalizer in the midseason rematch. After three seasons with the Whitecaps, Montero returned to Seattle  on a one-year deal with an option for 2023.

MLS honors

Cups

Between 2004 and 2008, the USL Seattle Sounders, Vancouver Whitecaps, and Portland Timbers competed for the supporter created Cascadia Cup, to be awarded to the club who finished with the best record in each season series between the three teams. The Cascadia Cup was created to celebrate the strong rivalries between each of the three clubs. Seattle won the Cascadia Cup twice in this five-year period while Portland never won. Seattle was not involved in the 2009 or 2010 competitions, both of which were won by Portland. While both Seattle and Portland consider Vancouver to be a rival, both of the U.S. fanbases consider their rivalries with Vancouver more cordial than with one another. In a 2011 story on the rivalry by Sports Illustrated writer Grant Wahl, one Timbers Army member said about Vancouver fans, "It's hard to dislike them because they're so nice", and an Emerald City Supporters member added, "They're like the nice cousin that's never going to offend anyone at a party." The MLS versions of the Whitecaps, Sounders and Timbers resumed contesting the Cascadia Cup, beginning with the 2011 season.

Results
For statistical purposes, matches that went to shootouts are counted as draws. Matches ending with a shootout are denoted with an '*'.

NASL era

A-League/USL era

MLS era

Friendlies

Western Conference standings finishes

{| class="wikitable"
|-
|* indicates Cascadia Cup win
|-
|}

• Total: Seattle with 10 higher finishes, Vancouver with 2.

See also
 Cascadia Cup
Portland Timbers–Vancouver Whitecaps rivalry
Seattle Sounders–Portland Timbers rivalry
 Cascadia (bioregion)
 MLS rivalry cups

References

1974 establishments in British Columbia
1974 establishments in Washington (state)
Major League Soccer rivalries
Vancouver Whitecaps FC
Seattle Sounders FC
Soccer in Seattle